Land use involves the management and modification of natural environment or wilderness into built environment such as settlements and semi-natural habitats such as arable fields, pastures, and managed woods. Land use by humans has a long history, first emerging more than 10,000 years ago. It has been defined as "the purposes and activities through which people interact with land and terrestrial ecosystems" and as "the total of arrangements, activities, and inputs that people undertake in a certain land type." Land use is one of the most important drivers of global environmental change.

History 
Human tribes since prehistory have segregated land into territories to control the use of land. Today, the total arable land is 10.7% of the land surface, with 1.3% being permanent cropland.

Regulation 

Land use practices vary considerably across the world. The United Nations' Food and Agriculture Organization Water Development Division explains that "Land use concerns the products and/or benefits obtained from use of the land as well as the land management actions (activities) carried out by humans to produce those products and benefits." As of the early 1990s, about 13% of the Earth was considered arable land, with 26% in pasture, 32% forests and woodland, and 1.5% urban areas. Land change modeling can be used to predict and assess future shifts in land use.

As Albert Guttenberg (1959) wrote many years ago, "'Land use' is a key term in the language of city planning." Commonly, political jurisdictions will undertake land-use planning and regulate the use of land in an attempt to avoid land-use conflicts. Land use plans are implemented through land division and use ordinances and regulations, such as zoning regulations. Management consulting firms and non-governmental organizations will frequently seek to influence these regulations before they are codified.

United States 

In colonial America, few regulations were originally put into place regarding the usage of land. As society shifted from rural to urban, public land regulation became important, especially to city governments trying to control industry, commerce, and housing within their boundaries. The first zoning ordinance was passed in New York City in 1916, and, by the 1930s, most states had adopted zoning laws. In the 1970s, concerns about the environment and historic preservation led to further regulation.

Today, federal, state, and local governments regulate growth and development through statutory law. The majority of controls on land, however, stem from the actions of private developers and individuals. Three typical situations bringing such private entities into the court system are: suits brought by one neighbor against another; suits brought by a public official against a neighboring landowner on behalf of the public; and suits involving individuals who share ownership of a particular parcel of land. In these situations, judicial decisions and enforcement of private land-use arrangements can reinforce public regulation, and achieve forms and levels of control that regulatory zoning cannot. There is growing concern that land use regulation is a direct cause of housing segregation in the United States today.

Two major federal laws passed in the 1960s limit the use of land significantly. These are the National Historic Preservation Act of 1966 (today embodied in 16 U.S.C. 461 et seq.) and the National Environmental Policy Act of 1969 (42 U.S.C. 4321 et seq.).

The US Department of Agriculture has identified six major types of land use in the US. Acreage statistics for each type of land use in the contiguous 48 states in 2017 were as follows:

 Special use areas include national parks (29 M acres) and state parks (15 M), wildlife areas (64.4 M), highways (21 M), railroads (3M), military bases (25 M), airports (3M) and a few others. Miscellaneous includes cemeteries, golf courses, marshes, deserts, and other areas of "low economic value". ** The total land area of the US is 9.1 M km2 but the total used here refers only to the contiguous 48 states, without Alaska etc.

Environment 

Land use and land management practices have a major impact on natural resources including water, soil, nutrients, plants and animals. Land use information can be used to develop solutions for natural resource management issues such as salinity and water quality. For instance, water bodies in a region that has been deforested or having erosion will have different water quality than those in areas that are forested. Forest gardening, a plant-based food production system, is believed to be the oldest form of land use in the world.

The major effect of land use on land cover since 1750 has been deforestation of temperate regions. More recent significant effects of land use include urban sprawl, soil erosion, soil degradation, salinization, and desertification. Land-use change, together with use of fossil fuels, are the major anthropogenic sources of carbon dioxide, a dominant greenhouse gas.

According to a report by the United Nations' Food and Agriculture Organization, land degradation has been exacerbated where there has been an absence of any land use planning, or of its orderly execution, or the existence of financial or legal incentives that have led to the wrong land use decisions, or one-sided central planning leading to over-utilization of the land resources - for instance for immediate production at all costs. As a consequence the result has often been misery for large segments of the local population and destruction of valuable habitats and ecosystems.

Urban growth boundaries 
The urban growth boundary is one form of land-use regulation. For example, Portland, Oregon is required to have an urban growth boundary which contains at least  of vacant land. Additionally, Oregon restricts the development of farmland. The regulations are controversial, but an economic analysis concluded that farmland appreciated similarly to the other land.

See also

References

External links 
 Land-use and land-cover change defined at Encyclopedia of Earth 
 Land Use Law News Alert
 Land Use Law by Prof. Daniel R. Mandelker (Washington University in St. Louis School of Law)
 The Relationship Between Land Use Decisions and the Impacts on Our Water and Natural Resources
 Land Use Accountability Project The Center for Public Integrity
 Schindler's Land Use Page (Michigan State University Extension Land Use Team)
 Land Policy Institute at Michigan State University
 Land Use, Cornell University Law School